Alexander Anderson (c. 1878–1926) was a British socialist who helped found the Socialist Party of Great Britain.

Like most SPGB founder members Anderson had previously been in the Social Democratic Federation, however it was another individual of the same name who held various posts in that party. He was a member of the May 1904 Provisional Committee which led to the formation of the SPGB in June.

Anderson was one of the Party's top speakers in the period before the First World War and was also active as an administrator, being an Executive Committee member from 1904 to 1922 and Party Organiser from 1909 to 1915. He was briefly Acting General Secretary in 1905 (August to October) and stood as a local election candidate in St. Ann's Ward, Tottenham in 1910.

Anderson was a house painter by trade but was more usually out of work. He married another founder member, Margaret Pearson.  He died on 16 September 1926 of arterial sclerosis, aged 48.

References
R. Frank, “Reminiscences of an old member”, Socialist Standard, November 1964.
Obituary in Socialist Standard, October 1926.
Socialist Party of Great Britain 1904–1913 membership register
Socialist Party of Great Britain 1926–1931 membership register
Justice

Socialist Party of Great Britain members
Social Democratic Federation members
1870s births
1926 deaths
House painters